Seven ships of the Royal Navy have borne the name HMS Chameleon, or the archaic variants HMS Cameleon or HMS Camelion, after the Chameleon:

 was a 14-gun sloop launched in 1777. She foundered in 1780.
 was a 16-gun brig-sloop, formerly the civilian ship Hawke. She was purchased in 1780 and sold in 1783.
 was an 18-gun brig-sloop launched in 1795, laid up in 1805, and broken up in 1811. 
 was a 10-gun  launched in 1816 and sold in 1849.
 was a  screw sloop launched in 1860 and sold in 1883.
 was an  launched in 1910 and sold for scrapping in 1921.
 was an  launched in 1944 and broken up in 1966.

Sources

References

Royal Navy ship names